Borborbor is a Ghanaian and Togolese traditional dance performed by the Ewe people from the mid-Volta region of Ghana and Southern Togo including Kpalime and Lomé. The dance is performed especially during the festival of the chiefs and people of communities.

References

Volta Region
Ghanaian dances